Asen Panchev (1 October 1906 – 17 December 1989) was а Bulgarian footballer who played as a left wing.

Early life
He was born in Sofia, Bulgaria. He started his career in the local club Asparuh Sofia. Later moved to the youth club of Levski Sofia.

Club career
In Levski he stayed thirteen seasons, played in 107 games and scored a total of sixty goals. He played one season (1934–1935) for Bohemians Praha. After the end of the season, he returned to Levski, where he spent one more year before being forced to retire.

International career
In his stay in the national team of Bulgaria during the period 1926-1936 he took part in thirty-nine games, scoring seventeen goals. He was an inseparable part of the glorious pair with Asen Peshev. He has been compared to a flying arrow. His nickname was "Pancheto". On 9 June 1932, he managed to score a second-half hat-trick for Bulgaria against the powerful France, unfortunately, they went down only as consolation goals as they still lost 3-5. But the highlight of his international career came in the 1931 Balkan Cup, where he was the top goal scorer with 3 goals, having scored a brace against Turkey and a late winner against Yugoslavia that gave the title to his nation, and with it, Bulgaria's first piece of silverware. He was also part of the Bulgaria team that won the 1932 Balkan Cup, contributing with 2 goals. He also scored twice in the 1934-35 and 1936 editions, although his efforts proved useless to help Bulgaria win another Balkan Cup title. With 10 goals in the Balkan Cup, he is the shared third all-time top goal scorer in the competition's history. At the end of 1936 he was crippled and permanently became invalid.

Managerial career
He coached Levski in 1939-1940 when the team won the silver medals. In 1941-1942 he won the championship and cup with Levski Sofia. For a short period of time coaches Levski in 1952.

International goals
''Bulgaria score listed first, score column indicates score after each Panchev goal.

Awards

Player
Levski Sofia

Bulgarian champion: 1933 and 1937
Four times winner of Ulpia Serdika Cup: 1926, 1930, 1931, 1932
Sofia Championship: 1924, 1925, 1929, 1933, 1937

International
Bulgaria

Balkan Cup winner in 1931 and 1932

Individual
Top goalscorer of the 1931 Balkan Cup with 3 goals

Coach
Levski Sofia

Bulgarian Cup and Bulgarian League winner in 1942
Sofia Championship title holder in 1942 (part of a Treble winning season) and in 1943

References

1906 births
1989 deaths
Bulgarian footballers
Bulgaria international footballers
PFC Levski Sofia players
Bulgarian football managers
PFC Levski Sofia managers
Expatriate footballers in Czechoslovakia
Association football midfielders